The following is the discography of Dark Tranquillity, a six-piece Swedish melodic death metal band formed in Gothenburg in 1989. They are one of the longest-standing bands from the original Gothenburg metal scene. Since 2020 their line-up consists of vocalist Mikael Stanne, keyboardist Martin Brändström, and guitarists Christopher Amott and Johan Reinholdz.

Albums

Studio albums

Live albums

Compilation albums

Extended plays

Videos

Music videos

References

External links 
 

Heavy metal group discographies
Dark Tranquillity
Discographies of Swedish artists